Walmar Castle was launched at Sunderland in 1855. She sailed between England and China, India, Australia, and Java. A fire on Christmas Day 1877 destroyed her.

Career
Walmer Castle first appeared in Lloyd's Register (LR) in 1856.

Fate
A telegram from Batavia dated 11:40am 26 December 1876 reported that Walmer Castle, Lanfesty, master, had burnt to the water's edge. She had her outbound cargo on board and the entire cargo had been lost. She had been intending to sail from Java to Holland. The cause of the fire was not known.

Citations

1855 ships
Age of Sail merchant ships of England
Maritime incidents in December 1877